is a train station located in Fushimi-ku, Kyoto, Kyoto Prefecture, Japan.

Lines
Keihan Electric Railway
Keihan Main Line

Adjacent stations

References

Railway stations in Kyoto